Kazeem may refer to:

 Carol Kazeem, American politician
 Kazeem Manzur, British racecar driver
 Karim Kazeem, Nigerian footballer
 Musa al-Kadhim,  seventh Shiite Imam

See also 

 Khazim